The 1996 AFL draft was held at the conclusion of the 1996 Australian Football League (AFL) season. The inaugural rookie draft was held with the 1997 pre-season draft.

The AFL draft is the annual draft of new unsigned players by Australian rules football teams that participate in the main competition of that sport, the Australian Football League.

Clubs receive picks based on the position in which they finish on the ladder during the season, although these picks can be swapped around by teams for trading players.

Trades: club by club

Adelaide 

Carlton 

Collingwood 

Geelong 

Hawthorn 

North Melbourne 

Melbourne 

Port Adelaide 

For zone and uncontracted player selections see below

Richmond 

St Kilda 

Sydney 

West Coast 

Western Bulldogs 

1996 national draft

1997 pre-season draft

1997 rookie draft 
The first AFL rookie draft was held on 25 February 1997.  Only players aged between 18 and 23 were eligible to be drafted. Whilst each club could draft up to six players onto their Rookie Lists, only ,  and  selected a full complement, whilst  and  declined to take part.

Port Adelaide zone selections
As part of Port Adelaide's entry to the AFL they were entitled to recruit some uncontracted players from other AFL clubs and players from the SANFL prior to the national draft.  Clubs that lost players were entitled to compensation selections before both the first and second rounds of the 1996 national draft.

Uncontracted player selection
Ian Downsborough: compensation selections #1 (Michael Gardiner) and #24 (Josh Wooden)
Gavin Wanganeen: compensation selections #2 (Chris Heffernan) and #25 (Andrew Bomford)
Matthew Primus: compensation selections #3 (Rory Hilton) and #26 (Tim Notting) to  
Adam Heuskes: compensation selections #4 (Mark Kinnear) and #27 (Troy Cook)
Scott Cummings: compensation selections #5 (Daniel McAlister) and #28 (Jason Johnson)

Zone selections

Brisbane Lions pre-draft selections
As part of the conditions of the merger between Brisbane Bears and the Fitzroy Football Club, Brisbane was able to recruit up to eight players from Fitzroy into the newly created Brisbane Lions.

Scott Bamford       
John Barker
Brad Boyd 
Nick Carter
Shane Clayton
Simon Hawking
Chris Johnson
Jarrod Molloy

References

AFL Draft
Australian Football League draft